Lewis Bog Ecological Reserve is an ecological reserve located in the Agassiz Provincial Forest, Manitoba, Canada. It was established in 1987 under the Manitoba Ecological Reserves Act.

See also
 List of ecological reserves in Manitoba
 List of protected areas of Manitoba

References

External links
 iNaturalist: Lewis Bog Ecological Reserve

Protected areas established in 1987
Ecological reserves of Manitoba
Nature reserves in Manitoba
Protected areas of Manitoba